Dan Monroe Russell Jr. (March 15, 1913 – April 16, 2011) was a United States district judge of the United States District Court for the Southern District of Mississippi.

Education and career

Born on March 15, 1913, in Magee, Mississippi, Russell received a Bachelor of Arts degree from the University of Mississippi in 1935, and a Bachelor of Laws from the University of Mississippi School of Law in 1937. He was a claims adjuster in Jackson, Mississippi from 1937 to 1938. He was in private practice in Bay St. Louis, Mississippi from 1938 to 1941, and was a Lieutenant Commander in the Office of Naval Intelligence during World War II, from 1941 to 1945. He returned to private practice in Bay St. Louis from 1945 to 1965.

Federal judicial service

On September 24, 1965, Russell was nominated by President Lyndon B. Johnson to a seat on the United States District Court for the Southern District of Mississippi vacated by Judge Sidney Carr Mize. Russell was confirmed by the United States Senate on October 1, 1965, and received his commission the following day. He served as Chief Judge from 1971 to 1982, assuming senior status on October 25, 1983. His service terminated on April 16, 2011, due to his death in Gulfport, Mississippi.

References

Sources
 

1913 births
2011 deaths
People from Magee, Mississippi
University of Mississippi alumni
Judges of the United States District Court for the Southern District of Mississippi
United States district court judges appointed by Lyndon B. Johnson
20th-century American judges
United States Navy officers